The Open Source Developers' Conference (OSDC) was a non-profit conference for developers of open-source software. It was started in Australia in 2004, and later expanded to Israel, Taiwan, Malaysia, France and Norway, where conferences began in 2006, 2007, 2009, 2009 and 2015, respectively. No further conferences have been held since 2015.

The conference was open to talks about software developed for any platform or operating system so long as the talk was of interest to open-source developers. Talks about closed source projects which used open-source languages or open-source projects which used close source languages were accepted.  Talks have covered languages such as Perl, Python, PHP, Ruby, Groovy, Scala, Java, Mono and C.  Other talks have covered open-source tools such as databases and revision control systems or meta-topics such as talk presentation hints, and working with others.

History
The conference was founded by Scott Penrose and first organised by members of the Melbourne Perl Mongers group in Melbourne, Australia in 2004.  Originally it had been intended to be a YAPC-style (Perl) conference, but after discussions with the Melbourne PHP Users Group it was expanded to include PHP and Python talks. Following the 2004 conference's success, Scott Penrose created the Open Source Developers' Club Association to encourage programmers of other languages to also be involved in running the conference.  At first this was an entirely Melbourne based organisation, but after the 2005 conference, it expanded to include members from elsewhere in Australia.  At the end of 2006, control of running the conference for 2007 was given to a group in Brisbane, with the Open Source Developers' Club Association committee members taking the role of overseers.

In 2013 the Open Source Developers' Club Association awarded the running of the event to a team in Auckland New Zealand, further expanding the conference with an Australasian focus.

OSDC Australia

Locations

Keynotes
2015
 Dr. Maia Sauren (video)
 Mark Elwell: Climbing the Garden Wall – An Educator's Odyssey in Second Life and OpenSim (video)
 Richard Tubb: Opportunities in Openness. Driving positive change in local communities (video)
 Michael Cordover: EasyCount, freedom of information and openness (video)
 Pia Waugh: Open source in government: lessons from the community (video)
2014 
 Richard Keech: Linux-based Monitoring and Control in a Sustainable House
 
 Lynn Fine, Code for America: Using tech for improving social impact, involving community in open government, and helping governments make use of open source
 Dr Tom Stace: The current state of quantum computing, and related open source projects
2011
 Senator Kate Lundy [Parliamentary Secretary to the Prime Minister and Parliamentary Secretary for Immigration and Multicultural affairs]: Openness in government: from data to crowdsourcing
 Jonathon Oxer: Freedom for Atoms!
 Damian Conway: Fun with Dead Languages
 Brian Catto [Director of Architecture and Emerging Technologies, AGIMO]: Open Source Software and the Australian Government
 Tony Beal [Deputy General Counsel – Commercial, Australian Government Solicitor]: Legal Trips, Traps and Solutions for Open Source Software Developers
2010
 Ingy döt Net: C'Dent, the Acmeism and Everyone
 Nóirín Shirley: Baby Steps into Open Source – Incubation and Mentoring at Apache
 Michael Schwern: How to Report a Bug
  Damian Conway: Temporally Quaquaversal Virtual Nanomachine Programming In Multiple Topologically Connected Quantum-Relativistic Parallel Timespaces...Made Easy!
2009
 Karen Pauley: Understanding Volunteers
 Marty Pauly:
 Dhanji Prasanna: Google Wave
2008
 Anthony Baxter:
 Chris DiBona:
 Andrew Tridgell:
 Larry Wall:
 Pia Waugh:
2007:
 Rusty Russell: C: A Humbling Language (opening keynote)
 Rasmus Lerdorf: Exploring the Broken Web
 Paul Fenwick: An Illustrated History of Failure (dinner keynote)
 Jonathan Oxer: Software Freedom: Pragmatic Idealism?
 Nathan Torkington : Software For The Future (closing keynote)
2006:
Randal L. Schwartz: Free software – A look back, a look ahead (opening keynote)
Damian Conway: The Da Vinci Codebase (dinner keynote)
Richard Farnsworth: Open Source Synchrotron
Anthony Baxter: futurepython
 Scott Penrose: Zaltana.org  (closing keynote)
2005
 Anthony Baxter: How to give a good presentation (dinner keynote)
 Audrey Tang: Introduction to Pugs: Perl 6 in Haskell
 Jonathan Oxer: Making things Move: Finding Inappropriate Uses for Scripting Languages
 Savio Saldanha: Oils aint Oils: A comparison of some open source and closed source databases
 Pia and Jeff Waugh: "Untitled Keynote" (closing keynote)
2004
 Damian Conway: Perl 6: OO Made Insanely Great (opening keynote)
 Con Zymaris: Using the Open Source Methodology to Make Money from Your Software (dinner keynote)
 Nathan Torkington: Open Source Trends
 Anthony Baxter : "Scripting Language" My Arse: Using Python for Voice over IP
 Luke Welling: MySQL 2005
 Damian Conway: Sufficiently Advanced Technology (closing keynote)

Papers
Papers from OSDC Australia 2007
Papers from OSDC Australia 2006
Papers from OSDC Australia 2005 and 2006
Papers from OSDC Australia 2004

Best presentation

OSDC Israel

Locations

OSDC.tw (Taiwan)

Locations

OSDC.my (Malaysia)

Locations

OSDC.fr, France

Locations

OSDC.no, Nordic

Locations

See also
linux.conf.au
O'Reilly Open Source Convention
YAPC

External links

OSDC, Australia
OSDC, Israel
OSDC, Taiwan
OSDC, Malaysia
OSDC, France

Free-software conferences
Recurring events established in 2004